Fourphit (4-isothiocyanato-1-[1-phenylcyclohexyl]piperidine) is a covalent binding NMDA antagonist, dopaminergic and sigma receptor agonist.

See also
 Metaphit

References

Arylcyclohexylamines
Dopamine reuptake inhibitors
Dissociative drugs
NMDA receptor antagonists
Piperidines
Sigma agonists
Isothiocyanates